Cochlespira simillima is a species of sea snail, a marine gastropod mollusk in the family Cochlespiridae.

Description
The length of the shell varies between 20.75 mm and 45 mm.

Distribution
This marine species occurs off the Philippines and Madagascar

References

  Indo-Pacific mollusca;  Academy of Natural Sciences of Philadelphia. Delaware Museum of Natural History; v. 2 # 9-10: p. 403

External links
 
 Bouchet, Philippe, et al. "A quarter-century of deep-sea malacological exploration in the South and West Pacific: where do we stand? How far to go." Tropical deep-sea Benthos 25 (2008): 9–40

simillima
Gastropods described in 1969